Alfred R. Mitchell (1888-1972) was an American landscape painter. He was an early California Impressionist painter. Educated at the Pennsylvania Academy of Fine Arts, he was the president of the San Diego Art Guild and the La Jolla Art Association. He became known as the "Dean of San Diego County artists".

Early life
Alfred R. Mitchell was born on June 18, 1888, in York, Pennsylvania. He moved to San Diego, California in 1908 and studied with Maurice Braun in 1915. Mitchell won a silver medal at the 1915 Panama–California Exposition. He served in the United States Army during World War I. He enrolled at the Pennsylvania Academy of Fine Arts in 1916, and won the Cresson Traveling Scholarship and the Edward Bok Philadelphia Prize to visit museums in Europe in 1920; he graduated from the academy in 1921.

Career
Mitchell was the President of the San Diego Art Guild and the co-founder of the San Diego Museum of Art. He was a co-founder of the Fine Arts Society of San Diego in 1925. He was also the founding secretary of the Associated Artists of San Diego in 1929; it later changed its name to Contemporary Artists of San Diego.

Mitchell was also the founder of the Chula Vista Art Guild in Chula Vista, California in 1945. He was the co-founder and president of the La Jolla Art Association in La Jolla, California from 1951 to 1961. He exhibited his artwork at the San Diego Fine Arts Gallery from 1920 to 1927, and the La Jolla Library from 1923 to 1966.

Mitchell became known as the "Dean of San Diego County artists".

Death
Mitchell died in November 1972.

References

1888 births
1972 deaths
People from York, Pennsylvania
People from San Diego
Pennsylvania Academy of the Fine Arts alumni
American male painters
19th-century American painters
20th-century American painters
19th-century American male artists
20th-century American male artists